= Natalia Oberti Noguera =

CEO and founder

- Born: 1984 (age 41–42); New Jersey, United States
- Education: Yale University
- Occupation: Entrepreneur
- Known for: Creating an investor network focusing on woman

Natalia Oberti Noguera (born 1984) is a Latina cis queer CEO and founder of a women investors network named Pipeline Angels.

== Early life and education ==
Growing up, Natalia Oberti Noguera lived in New Jersey, Ecuador, Colombia, Honduras, the Dominican Republic, and then New Haven. She attended Yale University majoring in Economics and Comparative Literature and graduated in 2005. She completed to two master's degrees. Oberti Noguera is a cis LGBTQ Latina.

== Career ==
In 2008, Oberti Noguera founded, New York Women Social Entrepreneurs, a network of female social entrepreneurs that grew to more than 1,200 members.

In 2011, Oberti Noguera launched Pipeline Angles, a women and non-binary femme business funding and investing firm. All around the U.S., Pipeline Angels offers workshops and bootcamps for the individuals behind these for-profit social ventures. So far, these bootcamps have been held in Chicago, Boston, Los Angeles, etc., with more destinations planned. This organization has 300+ investors, aged 20 to 60, consisting of all different races, and ranging in all different backgrounds. It is with these investors and through these bootcamps that over $5 million has been invested in over fifty starter companies. Oberti Noguera sold Pipeline Angels in 2023 to the nonprofit Institute for Entrepreneurial Leadership, led by Jill Johnson.

Oberti Noguera also launched and hosts a podcast titled, "Pitch Makeover," aimed at spotlighting start-ups by men of color, non-binary people, and women while focusing on pitching and investing.

She was the recipient of the 2017 Nixon Peabody Trailblazer award.
